The Turkestan short-toed lark (Alaudala heinei) is a species of lark in the family Alaudidae. It is found in Ukraine and central Turkey through parts of Central Asia and southern Siberia west to south-central Mongolia and south to southern Afghanistan. This species and the Mediterranean short-toed lark (A. rufescens) were formerly considered conspecific and called the lesser short-toed lark, but a 2020 study recovered them as distinct species.

Subspecies
Four subspecies are recognized:

 Alaudala heinei pseudobaetica - (Stegmann, 1932): Found in eastern Turkey, Transcaucasia and northern Iran
 Alaudala heinei heinei - (Homeyer, 1873): Found from Ukraine to eastern Kazakhstan
 Alaudala heinei aharonii - (Hartert, 1910): Found in central Turkey
 Alaudala heinei persica - Sharpe, 1890: Found in eastern and southern Iraq to southern and south-western Afghanistan

References

 

Alaudala
Birds described in 1873
Birds of Eurasia